Azin or Andzin Rinpoche is an incarnate lama (tulku) in the Karma Kagyu school of Tibetan Buddhism associated with Palnge Monastery in Gegyal. Their reincarnations have been known for strict retreat practices and diligence in mastering the sutras. They have also been closely associated with Sherap Monastery and Tai Situpa as many of the reincarnations received their education there.

The current incarnation, Karma Thubten Trinlay Gyurme, was born on 22 March 1984.

Karma Kagyu tulkus
Karma Kagyu lamas
Rinpoches